The 2022–23 Coupe de France preliminary rounds, Brittany is the qualifying competition to decide which teams from the leagues of the Brittany region of France take part in the main competition from the seventh round.

A total of fourteen teams will qualify from the Brittany preliminary rounds.

In 2021–22, AS Vitré and Vannes OC both progressed to the round of 32. Vannes were beaten by Paris Saint-Germain, whilst Vitré lost to eventual winner FC Nantes.

Draws and fixtures
On 18 June 2022, the league announced that 688 teams had entered the competition from the region. The draw for the first round was published on 25 August 2022, featuring 554 teams.

The second round draw was published on 30 August 2022, with 123 teams entering at this stage. A total of 200 ties were drawn, but only 199 were scheduled due to penalties from the first round.

The third round draw was published on 5 September 2022, with 12 teams from Championnat National 3 entering at this stage. The fourth round draw, which saw the entry of the two teams from Championnat National 2, was published on 14 September 2022.

The fifth round draw, featuring the two teams in the region from Championnat National, was published on 29 September 2022. The sixth round draw was published on 10 October 2022.

First round
These matches were played on 27 and 28 August 2022.

Second round
These matches were played on 4 September 2022.

Third round
These matches were played on 10 and 11 September 2022.

Fourth round
These matches were played on 24 and 25 September 2022.

Fifth round
These matches were played on 8 and 9 October 2022.

Sixth round
These matches were played on 15 and 16 October 2022.

References

Preliminary rounds